Whitelee Wind Farm is a windfarm on the Eaglesham moor in Scotland. The main visitor centre is located in East Renfrewshire, but the majority of turbines are located in East Ayrshire and South Lanarkshire.  It is the largest on-shore wind farm in the United Kingdom with 215 Siemens and Alstom wind turbines and a total capacity of 539 megawatts (MW), with the average of 2.5 MW per turbine. Whitelee was developed and is operated by ScottishPower Renewables, which is part of the Spanish company Iberdrola.

The Scottish government had a target of generating 31% of Scotland's electricity from renewable energy by 2011 and 100% by 2020. The majority of this is likely to come from wind power.

Description
Positioned 300 metres (985 feet) above sea level and  outside Glasgow, Scotland’s largest city, the wind farm has over half a million people living within a 30 km radius, which makes Whitelee one of the first large-scale wind farms to be developed close to a centre of population.

In May 2009, Whitelee was officially opened to the public by Alex Salmond MSP, First Minister for Scotland. However, Whitelee was generating power more than a year before this with the first phase of the wind farm supplying power to the electricity grid in January 2008.

In late 2018 the BBC's Weather World program visited the farm on a record breaking day.  Control Centre Manager Mark Gailey stated that the Whitelee would produce 6GWh that day.

Public access and visitor centre

Whitelee has become an eco-tourist attraction aided by an on site visitor centre. The visitor centre is host to an interactive exhibition room, cafe, shop and education hub. It was officially opened to the public in September 2009. The visitor centre also gives access to a network of over 90 km of paths for cyclists, ramblers and horse riders.  The visitor centre is managed by Glasgow Science Centre and offers activities for education and community groups.
There is also a dedicated - free - electric vehicle charging station.

Whitelee wind farm has a Countryside Ranger Service operated jointly by East Renfrewshire and South Lanarkshire councils that works to promote and develop access opportunities for the public within the wind farm and wider area, as well as operating an annual program of free activities and events open to the public. The Whitelee Countryside Ranger Service also works to encourage and assist community and charity organisations to use of access opportunities within the wind farm for fundraising and charity events. The Ranger Service forms part of the Whitelee Access Planning Group which is made up of the wind farm operators, land owners, the three local authorities the wind farm comes within, local community groups and other interested parties to the site.

In January 2014 work began on a purpose built single track mountain bike course at the windfarm, within a hollow created by a former borrow pit  that was used to supply stone during construction of the windfarm. This development is being led by East Renfrewshire Council on behalf of the Whitelee Access Planning Group. The track has been designed by Phil Saxena of Architrail Ltd – designer of the 2008 Beijing Olympic and 2014 Glasgow Commonwealth Games XC courses.

The project has followed strong public demand for more technical MTB facilities at Whitelee. Its setting within the UK’s largest onshore windfarm will make it unique amongst trail centres. The plans will provide graded trails to suit a wide range of users, from beginners to more experienced riders. The course will offer a mix of route options, technical sections and challenges, as well as a large picnic and viewing area, with wet weather shelters for use by families, clubs, schools etc. The facilities will extend across an area of approximately 12 hectares and will be free to use, 7 days a week.

The site also hosts an annual running event called "Run the Blades", with a 10K, half-marathon and a 50K ultra-marathon distance to choose from.

In June 2012, Whitelee wind farm became the first wind energy project in Scotland to join the Association of Scottish Visitor Attractions. The management took the decision after nearly 250,000 people had visited the site since its opening since July 2009. ScottishPower Renewables said that nearly 10,000 pupils had so far visited Whitelee on school trips. In addition, at least "another 100,000 people had accessed the wind farm's 96km (56 miles) of trails for recreational purposes such as jogging and cycling". By 2020 the onsite visitor centre had more than 700,000 visitors and the increased the length of tracks to 130km available walk or cycle.

Lochgoin Farm and Monument

The wind farm area includes Lochgoin Farm, the home of the Howie family which in the 17th century  was a noted refuge for Covenanters, and was searched multiple times by government soldiers. In the 18th century John Howie became a biographer who recorded the lives of Covenanting martyrs in books published from 1775 onwards. In 1896 a stone obelisk was erected nearby as a monument "in memory of John Howie, author of the Scots Worthies"; this is accessible by the tracks leading from the visitor centre. A small museum at the farm holds relics of Covenanters, check for opening arrangements.

Extensions
In May 2009, the Scottish Government granted permission for an extension to the wind farm to produce up to a further 130 megawatts of power, which would increase the total generating capacity of Whitelee to 452 MW.

In 2010 a 75 turbine extension commenced, adding an additional 217 MW of capacity, enough to power the equivalent of over 124,000 homes. This brought the total generating capacity of the wind farm up to 539 MW. Additionally, the extension added a further 44 km of trails to the site. John Sisk and Son Limited and Roadbridge were jointly appointed as Principal Contractors for the site during construction with Alstom Limited erecting and commissioning the wind turbines.

In August 2012 Scottish Power announced that it was applying for a further small extension of five turbines on the west of the existing site, adding 12 MW of capacity. This was refused by the DPEA on 19 Oct 2016.

A £21 million (US$29.35 million) 50MW/50MWh grid battery is being added to improve resource utilization, with plans for a 40 MW solar farm and a 20 MW hydrogen electrolyzer.

Incidents 
On 19 March 2010 a blade snapped off a turbine, resulting in temporary suspension of operations while safety checks were completed on all other turbines on the site. Following the accident Keith Anderson, managing director of ScottishPower Renewables, said: "This type of incident is exceptionally rare and highly unusual."

In March 2017 a turbine lost its nose cone, the entire site was closed until such time as the remaining turbines could be checked and tested.

On 29 March 2017 a Spanish worker died falling from a turbine while it was undergoing maintenance.

See also

 Wind power in Scotland
 List of onshore wind farms

References

Gallery

External links

 Official website

2009 establishments in Scotland
Buildings and structures in East Renfrewshire
Buildings and structures in South Lanarkshire
Buildings and structures in East Ayrshire
Wind farms in Scotland
Tourist attractions in East Renfrewshire
Science museums in Scotland
Energy infrastructure completed in 2009
Science centers